Roentgen Stories is a DVD collective of four promotional videos (PVs) by popular Japanese rock vocalist Hyde.  Released November 3, 2004 by Ki/oon Records and Haunted Records.

Contents
It features the PVs of the three singles and additional bonus music video.  All songs are from his first solo album, Roentgen.

 "Evergreen" (single released 2001.10.17)
 "Angel's Tale" (single released 2001.12.12)
 "Shallow Sleep" (single released 2002.02.27)
 "Secret Letters"

The order the videos are arranged on the DVD are coincidentally the order in which they were released.

The videos are meant to be watched in a series, so that the four together tell a story, with prevailing themes of life and death and the mingling of the two.  The sweeping ballads of Roentgen mask a much more solemn message.

Covers note
An interesting note is that the cover of the Evergreen single features one rose.  Angel's Tale features two tulips.  Continuing in this pattern, Shallow Sleep, the third single released should have three lilies but instead, the single's cover clearly depicts four lilies.

Two theories are possible:

1. Lilies are a classic symbol of death.  The number 'four' (四; shi) is a Japanese homonym of death (死; shi.)  
2. Roentgen Stories features not only the trilogy of singles, but also a music video for another Roentgen song, Secret Letters.  Perhaps Secret Letters was the "lost" third single.

The first theory is more likely, though, due to the arrangement of the videos on the DVD and the progression of the story told through them.

See also
Roentgen (album)

External links
 HYDEIST (official site)
 HAUNTED RECORDS (record label)
 L'Arc~en~Ciel (Official Site)
 TOFU RECORDS (artist page)

Hyde (musician) albums
2004 video albums